Kessens Peak is a peak,  high, located  southeast of Mount Paine in the La Gorce Mountains, in the Queen Maud Mountains of Antarctica. It was mapped by the United States Geological Survey from surveys and U.S. Navy air photos, 1960–63, and was named by the Advisory Committee on Antarctic Names for Gerard R. Kessens of U.S. Navy Squadron VX-6, a photographer on Operation Deep Freeze 1966 and 1967.

References

Mountains of Marie Byrd Land